Men's Super G World Cup 1988/1989

Calendar

Final point standings

In Men's Super G World Cup 1988/89 all four results count.

Men's Super G Team Results

bold indicate highest score - italics indicate race wins

References 

World Cup
FIS Alpine Ski World Cup men's Super-G discipline titles